The Milk River is a tributary of the Goat River, which is a tributary of the Fraser River, in the Canadian province of British Columbia.

See also
List of British Columbia rivers

References

Rivers of British Columbia
Tributaries of the Fraser River
Cariboo Land District